Chaeng Watthana Government Complex, or formally, the Government Complex Commemorating His Majesty the King's 80th Birthday Anniversary, 5 December, BE 2550 (2007), is a complex of Thai Government buildings on Chaeng Watthana Road, Thung Song Hong Subdistrict, Lak Si District, Bangkok.
The complex was built in commemoration of King Bhumibol Adulyadej's 80th birthday. The complex construction project started in 2005 under Thaksin Shinawatra's regime and was completed in 2008. Its opening ceremony was held on 17 February 2010 by Crown Prince Vajiralongkorn and Prince Dipangkorn Rasmijoti. The project cost 20,000 million baht.

The  of land on which the complex sits belongs to the Treasury Department, Ministry of Finance. The complex is administered by Dhanarak Asset Development (ธนารักษ์พัฒนาสินทรัพย์) or DAD, a state enterprise attached to the Treasury Department.

Structure

The complex is divided into three zones: Zone A (100 rai) and Zone B (197 rai) are for government buildings, and Zone C (152 rai) supports the growth of the complex itself. The governmental buildings in the complex are divided into two groups:

Ratchaburidirekrit Building 
Building A (อาคารเอ), or formally, the Ratchaburidirekrit Building (อาคารราชบุรีดิเรกฤทธิ์; named for Prince Raphi Phatthanasak, Prince of Ratchaburi (1874–1920), whom some consider to be the "father of Thai law"), is in Zone A and includes the justice-related agencies:

 Administrative Courts
 Central Administrative Court
 Office of Administrative Courts
 Supreme Administrative Court
 Constitutional Court
 Courts of Justice
 Central Bankruptcy Court
 Central Intellectual Property and International Trade Court
 Supreme Court of Justice
 Don Mueang Kwaeng Court
 Office of the Attorney General

Ratthaprasatphakdi Building 
Building B (อาคารบี), or formally, the Ratthaprasatphakdi Building (อาคารรัฐประศาสนภักดี), is in Zone B and is includes administrative agencies:

 Independent agencies
 Office of Election Commission of Thailand
 Office of National Human Rights Commission
 Office of Ombudsmen
 Ministry of Finance
 Bangkok Regional Revenue Office 9
 Treasury Department
 Ministry of Foreign Affairs
 Thailand International Cooperation Agency (TICA)
 Devawongse Varopakarn Institute of Foreign Affairs (DVIFA)
 Ministry of Digital Economy and Society
 National Statistical Office of Thailand
 Permanent Secretariat for Information and Communication Technology
 Digital Economy Promotion Agency (Public Organisation)
 Ministry of Interior 
 Department of Community Development
 Department of Land
 Ministry of Justice 
 Central Institute of Forensic Science
 Department of Special Investigation
 Office of Justice Affairs
 Ministry of Natural Resources and Environment 
 Biodiversity-Based Economy Development Office (Public Organisation)
 Department of Marine and Coastal Resources
 Thailand Greenhouse Gas Management Organisation (Public Organisation)
 Ministry of Public Health 
 Office of National Health Security
 Ministry of Science and Technology
 Geo-Informatics and Space Technology Development Agency (Public Organisation)
 Office of the Prime Minister
 Office of Consumer Protection Commission
 Office of National Economic and Social Advisory Council
 Office of the National Security Council
 Parliamentary agency
 King Prajadhipok's Institute
 Royal Thai Police
 Immigration Bureau
 Office of Forensic Science Police

Other Buildings 
Other buildings include the "Chaeng Watthana Centara Government Complex Hotel and Convention Centre", a hotel with a convention centre called "Wayuphak Hall".

References

External links 
 Official website

Government buildings in Bangkok
Government of Thailand